The Wilma was built in 1921 by William "Billy" Simons and dedicated to his wife, light opera artist Edna Wilma. Designed by Norwegian architect Ole Bakke and his assistant H. E. Kirkemo, the steel-framed highrise features hallmarks of Sullivanesque architecture. Wilma is part of an eight-story complex that was the first steel-framed high-rise building in Missoula, and includes the main 1400-seat hall, a lounge, three banquet rooms, a restaurant, apartments and offices. The theater interior is decorated with Louis XIV Style gilt trim.

The Wilma's original theater organ was replaced in the 1950s with a Robert Morton organ from the Orpheum Theater in Spokane, Washington, which had been torn down in 1958.

As originally built, the basement housed a swimming pool, the "Crystal Plunge". Condensation proved incompatible with the structure, and the pool closed within ten years. It now serves as additional storage space.

In 1982 the Cinema of the Dove opened in the basement of the building. It was also known as the Chapel of the Dove.  It was operated by Edward Sharp.  The Chapel of the Dove was described as a "dazzlingly eclectic space."  The Chapel of the Dove was turned into a more conventional theater after Edward Sharp died in 1993.

The Wilma now shows a diverse range of entertainment, including independent movies, spoken word events, stand up comedy, live and local music, plays, and other events.

The Venue is equipped with a full PA system and stage monitors with Yamaha M7 consoles at the core, as well as a secondary PA for use with the main movie screen. The Wilma also employs a full theater lighting system with PAR and Leko fixtures, and six Martin Mac 500 automated moving head fixtures. The lighting is controlled by a Pearl 2000 console.

References

External links

Theatres on the National Register of Historic Places in Montana
Theatres completed in 1921
Cinemas and movie theaters in Montana
Music venues in Montana
National Register of Historic Places in Missoula, Montana
Tourist attractions in Missoula, Montana
1921 establishments in Montana